Tiarosporella urbis-rosarum is an endophytic fungus that might be a latent pathogen. It was found on Acacia karroo, a common tree in southern Africa.

References

Further reading
Jami, Fahimeh, et al. "Greater Botryosphaeriaceae diversity in healthy than associated diseased Acacia karroo tree tissues." Australasian Plant Pathology 42.4 (2013): 421–430.
Slippers, Bernard, et al. "Confronting the constraints of morphological taxonomy in the Botryosphaeriales." Persoonia: Molecular Phylogeny and Evolution of Fungi 33 (2014): 155.

External links 
MycoBank

Leotiomycetidae
Fungi described in 2012
Fungal plant pathogens and diseases